Dolly Gallagher Levi is a fictional character and the protagonist of the 1938 play The Merchant of Yonkers and its multiple adaptations, the most notable being the 1964 musical Hello Dolly! Levi's main profession is matchmaking in Yonkers, New York. She also begins a romantic involvement with businessman, Horace Vandergelder, when she sends his niece on a date with a local town boy.

Character description

Plays 

Dolly Levi is a "widow in her middle years who has decided to begin her life again. She is a matchmaker, meddler, opportunist, and a life-loving woman." She is from Yonkers, New York and was married to Ephram Levi, who dies before the events of the story. She is loud, brassy, and constantly meddling in others' lives. These qualities make her beloved by her hometown. During one of her matchmaking jobs, she meets half-a-millionaire, Horrace Vandergelder, who owns a store in downtown Yonkers. During the story, she attempts to make him fall in love with her, though her attempts are mostly unsuccessful. She also constantly quotes her late husband's favorite saying: Money is like manure. It's no good unless you spread it around.

Stage musical 

During the first act of the musical, Dolly is still quite attached to her late husband, Ephram. However, during the act finale, "Before the Parade Passes By," she decides to move on with her life and chase after Horrace's affections. In the titular song, Dolly claims to the waiters of the Harmonia Gardens restaurant that she will never leave New York again.

Musical film adaptation 

While many portrayals of Levi in the musical are comedic and loving, Barbra Streisand's concept of the character is more harsh to those around her, especially Horace (who is played by Walter Matthau). This feeling can be seen especially in the penultimate song, "So Long Dearie."

Notable portrayals 

 Jane Cowl in the original Broadway cast of The Merchant of Yonkers
 Ruth Gordon in the original Broadway cast of The Matchmaker
 Shirley Booth in the 1958 film adaptation of the same name

Hello Dolly! 
 Carol Channing in the original, third, and fourth broadway casts, first West End revival, and second national touring cast 
 Betty Grable, Ethel Merman, and Ginger Rogers as replacements in the original broadway cast
 Mary Martin in the original West End and first international touring cast
 Barbra Streisand in the 1969 film of the same name
 Pearl Bailey in the first Broadway revival and as a replacement in the original broadway cast
 Danny La Rue in the second West End revival
 Samantha Spiro in the third West End revival
 Sally Struthers in the 50th anniversary tour
 Bette Midler in the fourth Broadway revival
 Bernadette Peters and Donna Murphy as replacements in the fourth Broadway revival
 Betty Buckley in the first national touring cast
 Carolee Carmello as a replacement for the first national touring cast
 Imelda Staunton in an upcoming fourth West End revival

Notes

Additions 
Clips from the 1969 musical film were featured in the 2008 computer-animated film WALL-E.

References 

Female characters in literature
Fictional characters from New York (state)
Literary characters introduced in 1938